United Nations Security Council Resolution 280 was adopted on May 19, 1970. After reaffirming its previous resolutions on the topic, the Council condemned Israel for its premeditated military action in violation of its obligations under the Charter. The resolution declared that such armed attacks could no longer be tolerated and that if they were the Council would consider taking adequate and effective steps in accordance with the Charter. The Council also deplored the loss of life and damage to property. The resolution came in the context of Palestinian insurgency in South Lebanon.

The resolution was adopted with 11 votes; Colombia, Nicaragua, Sierra Leone and the United States abstained from voting.

See also 
 List of United Nations Security Council Resolutions 201 to 300 (1965–1971)

References 
Text of the Resolution at undocs.org

External links
 

 0280
 0280
Palestinian insurgency in South Lebanon
1970 in Israel
1970 in Lebanon
 0280
May 1970 events